Somatina sublucens is a moth of the  family Geometridae. It is found in New Guinea.

References

Moths described in 1907
Scopulini